Carrigeen is a village to the south-east of Mooncoin in County Kilkenny, Ireland. Carrigeen is  situated on a hillock within the Suir Valley, contains St. Kevin's Church and belongs to the parish of Mooncoin.  There is a primary school and a GAA club in Carrigeen.

St. Kevin's Church is one of the three churches of the parish of Mooncoin, together with a church in Killinaspick and Mooncoin.

History 

Carrigeen is located close to two of Ireland's most ancient villages, Licketstown and Glengrant, which date to Norman times.

Oliver Cromwell recognised the value of the land as he passed under the shadow of the Walsh Hills on his approach to Carrick-on-Suir from New Ross. He is reported to have said, "It is a land worth fighting for".

Geography 

Carrigeen is situated on a hillock within the Suir Valley, it has a panoramic view of the south of County Kilkenny including Slieve na mBan, Tory Hill and the Comeragh Mountains.

Education 
Carrigeen National School celebrated its centenary in September 2000. Carrigeen is the third school in this area of south Kilkenny. Clashroe and the present community hall adjoining the churchyard were former schools. Carrigeen originally had a hedge school at Portnascully or "Field of the School" where a travelling master would have taught. President  Mary McAleese visited Carrigeen National School on 15 April 2003.

Landmarks 
Historic landmarks surrounding Carrigeen include Grannagh and Corluddy Castle. Corluddy, or the round hill of the mine, is situated on a hill overlooking the River Suir. This castle was built during the Norman period. Grant, the landlord of Glengrant, lived there.

St. Kevin's Church, Carrigeen, is one of the three churches of the parish of Mooncoin, together with a church in Killinaspick and Mooncoin.

People 
Bob O'Keeffe, after whom the trophy awarded for the Leinster Senior Hurling Championship is named, was a native of Glengrant, Mooncoin. O'Keeffe became a prominent figure in the Gaelic Athletic Association (GAA) councils and was president of the association from 1935 to 1938. After his death, the GAA decided to donate a trophy in his memory—the Bob O'Keeffe Memorial Cup. The hurler depicted on the top of the cup is barefooted, which is significant in view of the fact that Bob O'Keeffe originally played in that manner.

Sport 
Carrigeen GAA club was formed in 1954. Asper Park, the club grounds, was officially opened in 1991 by Paddy Buggy of Slieverue, former President of the GAA. Carrigeen play in black and amber stripes. As of 2008, the club was reportedly spending €500,000 developing its grounds, with the National Lottery putting up €200,000, Kilkenny County Council €100,000, and the club raising the remaining €200,000.

See also 
 List of towns and villages in Ireland

Footnotes

Further reading

External links 
 Carrigeen Primary School
 Diocese of Ossory Mooncoin Page
 About Corluddy Castle

Towns and villages in County Kilkenny